Puri–Kamakhya Weekly Express (via Adra) is an Express train belonging to Northeast Frontier Railway zone that runs between  in Odisha and  in Assam, via  , . It is currently being operated with 15639/15640 train numbers on a weekly basis.

Speed 

15639/ Puri–Kamakhya Express has an average speed of 49 km/hr and covers 1520 km in 31h 10m. On the other hand, 15640/ Kamakhya–Puri Express has an average speed of 47 km/hr and covers 1520 km in 32h 15m.

Route and halts 

Puri Kamakhya Express runs through the following stations:

ODISHA
 
 Sakhi Gopal
  
 
 
 
 

WEST BENGAL
 
 
 
 
 
 
 
 
 
 
 New Jalpaiguri (Siliguri)
 
 

JHARKHAND
 

BIHAR
 

ASSAM

Coach composition

The train has standard LHB coach. The rakes are maintained by Northeast Frontier Railways. This train consists of 20 coaches that include:

 1 AC II Tier (2A)
 5 AC III Tier (3A)
 10 Sleeper class coaches (SL)
 2 General Unreserved
 2 EOG

Direction reversal 
During its journey, this train reverses its direction once at Durgapur railway station.

Traction

As the route is fully electrified, it is hauled by a Howrah Electric Loco Shed-based WAP-4 Electric locomotive from Puri to Kamakhya Junction and vice versa.

Rake maintenance and sharing 

The train is maintained by Northeast Frontier Railway. It shares its rake with 15643/15644 Puri–Kamakhya Weekly Express (via Howrah).

See also 

 Kamakhya Junction railway station
 Puri railway station
 Puri–Kamakhya Weekly Express (via Howrah)
Paharia Express

References

External links 

 15639/Puri - Kamakhya Express (via Adra) India Rail Info
 15640/Kamakhya - Puri Express (via Adra) India Rail Info

Transport in Puri
Transport in Guwahati
Express trains in India
Rail transport in Odisha
Rail transport in West Bengal
Rail transport in Jharkhand
Rail transport in Bihar
Rail transport in Maharashtra
Railway services introduced in 2003